Tuzkol ("salt lake") may refer to:

Tuzkol, Bayanaul District, a lake in the Pavlodar Region, Kazakhstan
Tuzkol, Mendykara District, a lake in the Kostanay Region, Kazakhstan
Tuzkol, Raiymbek District, a lake in the Almaty Region, Kazakhstan

See also
Tuz (disambiguation)